Megan Marrs (born 25 September 1997) is a British track and field athlete who competes in hurdling. She is a two-time gold medalist at the British Indoor Athletics Championships.

She competed in the women's 60 metres hurdles event at the 2018 IAAF World Indoor Championships held in Birmingham, United Kingdom. She also competed in the women's 60 metres hurdles event at the 2022 World Athletics Indoor Championships held in Belgrade, Serbia.

International competitions

References

External links 
 

Living people
1997 births
Place of birth missing (living people)
British female hurdlers
Alumni of Loughborough University
20th-century British women
21st-century British women